The Oakville Trafalgar Memorial Hospital is a full-service acute care community hospital located at 3001 Hospital Gate in Oakville, Ontario. It offers a comprehensive range of primary and secondary care services in addition to some tertiary services. It is operated by Halton Healthcare, an organization which also operates Georgetown Hospital and Milton District Hospital. The hospital is supported by the Oakville Hospital Foundation and the Oakville Hospital Volunteer Association which raises funds to purchase equipment for the hospital. The new hospital was opened in 2015 and the hospital is affiliated with the Michael G. DeGroote School of Medicine at McMaster University.

History
The hospital was designed by Parkin Architects and Adamson Associates and built by a joint venture of EllisDon and Carillion. On December 13, 2015 the hospital moved from 327 Reynolds Street (now Oakville Trafalgar Community Centre) to 3001 Hospital Gate near Dundas Street and Third Line.

Patient statistics
OTMH has more than 15,000 inpatients each year, while over 240,000 patients visit its outpatient areas. There are 2,300 births a year. The hospital's busy 24-hour emergency department experiences more than 70,000 visits annually.

References

External links

Hospital buildings completed in 1937
Hospital buildings completed in 1950
Hospitals in Ontario
Buildings and structures in Oakville, Ontario
Hospitals established in 1937
Heliports in Ontario
Certified airports in Ontario
1937 establishments in Ontario